Walang Pagkalupig
(also known as "Never outfought") is a 1962 action film based on true story of PC Ranger Captain Laudemer Kahulugan. The film was directed by Pablo Santiago, written by Tommy C. David and stars Fernando Poe Jr., Joseph Estrada, Rodolfo Cristobal & Bert Silva. In this film the story centers around the heroic exploits PC Ranger Captain Laudemer Kahulugan (Fernando Poe, Jr.) tasked to hunt down Huk dissident leader Casto Alejandrino (Van de Leon).

Cast 

 Fernando Poe Jr.
 Joseph Estrada
 Rodolfo Cristobal
 Bert Silva
 Van De Leon
 Paquito Diaz
 Oscar Roncal
 Jerry Pons
 Yolanda Guevarra
 Helen Gamboa

Awards and nominations

References 

Films directed by Pablo Santiago
Philippine action films